Joseph-Théodule Rhéaume (September 13, 1874 – August 10, 1954) was a Quebec politician, lawyer and judge.

Rhéaume earned his law degree at Laval University and was admitted to the bar in 1903 and became King's Counsel in 1914.

He was elected by acclamation as a Liberal to the House of Commons of Canada in the riding of Jacques Cartier in a 1922 by-election. He was re-elected in the 1925 and 1926 federal elections twice defeating Esioff-Léon Patenaude who was Conservative leader Arthur Meighen's Quebec lieutenant and Justice minister. However, Rhéaume lost his seat in the 1930 federal election.

Rhéaume moved to provincial politics and was elected by acclamation to the Legislative Assembly of Quebec as the Quebec Liberal Party MLA for Jacques-Cartier provincial electoral district in 1933. He did not run for re-election in the 1935 provincial election.

In 1936, he was appointed to the bench of the Quebec Superior Court for the district of Montreal.

Electoral record

References

Liberal Party of Canada MPs
Members of the House of Commons of Canada from Quebec
Quebec Liberal Party MNAs
Lawyers in Quebec
Judges in Quebec
1874 births
1954 deaths
Canadian King's Counsel